Mike Welch OBE (born 28 September 1978) is a British entrepreneur, and founder of online tyre retailer Blackcircles.com.

Biography
Born in Liverpool, England, Welch left school aged 16 and began working as a tyre fitter. He quit in 1996, just weeks after joining, to launch his first tyre retail business, MW Motorforce. He ran the company from a room in his parents’ house with a mobile phone and help from a £500 grant from The Prince's Trust.

Career 
Welch moved to Edinburgh after being head-hunted by Sir Tom Farmer to work as Kwik-Fit's New Business and e-Commerce Manager in 2000. He left the company two years later after he was told he would have to wait 30–40 years to make chief executive.

Blackcircles.com is now a significant player in the UK tyre retail market, generating sales of around $100m annually and looking after over 2,000,000 customers.

In 2015 Blackcircles.com was acquired by Michelin, the largest tyre manufacturer in the world at that time. Welch has left his position as CEO but continues to advise the board as a consultant.

In 2016 he launched Atterley.com, a network of fashion boutiques selling to consumers globally.

In 2019 Welch launched US online tire retailer Tirescanner.com.

Business Ventures
Mike set up Blackcircles.com in 2001 with a first year turnover of £10,000. Today Blackcircles.com has grown to be a significant player in the UK tyre retail market, generating sales of around $100m annually and looking after over 2,000,000 customers. The company is still headquartered in the Scottish Borders town of Peebles.

In 2011, Tesco Tyres.com was launched, a joint venture between Blackcircles.com and Tesco Plc, the world's second largest retailer.

Sir Terry Leahy the former CEO of Tesco Plc is a shareholder in Blackcircles.com. The chairman of Blackcircles.com is Graeme Bissett, former Group Finance Director of Kwik-Fit.

Awards and recognitions

Welch was appointed an OBE in the 2015 New Year honours list for services to business and voluntary services to adoption & fostering. Welch has won a number of awards over the years including: 
Shell Livewire Entrepreneur of the year
HSBC Start-up Stars
The National Business Awards Entrepreneur of the year
Ernst & Young Emerging Entrepreneur of the year
Ernst & Young Young Entrepreneur of the year
BT Essence of The Entrepreneur Award
BT Outstanding Entrepreneur of the Year
SBAAT Young Business Achiever 2011
Business Insider Young Business Leader of the Year 2012
The RSE Henry Duncan Medal 2017
Honorary Doctorate for Business from Edinburgh Napier University 2016

(OBE) Officer of the Most Excellent Order of the British Empire

References

External links
Blackcircles.com

 Atterley.com

 Tirescannner.com

British businesspeople
1978 births
Living people
British technology company founders
Tire industry people
Officers of the Order of the British Empire